Johnson Township is an inactive township in Polk County, in the U.S. state of Missouri.

Johnson Township has the name of Vice President Richard Mentor Johnson.

References

Townships in Missouri
Townships in Polk County, Missouri